The name Melanippus is the masculine counterpart of Melanippe.

In Greek mythology, there were several people named Melanippus:
Melanippus, one of the sons of Agrius and possibly Dia, daughter of King Porthaon of Calydon. Along with his brothers, except Thersites, he was killed by Diomedes.
Melanippus or Menalippus, brother of Tydeus and thus possible son of Oeneus, king of Calydon and Periboea. He was accidentally slain by Tydeus during a hunt. In some accounts, the murdered brother of Tydeus was called Olenias.
Melanippus, son of Perigune and Theseus, the father of Ioxus who, together with Ornytus, led a colony to Caria and became the ancestor of the family Ioxides.
Melanippus, sometimes misspelled "Menalippus", son of Astacus (hence referred to by the patronymic Astacides in Ovid), defender of Thebes in Aeschylus' play Seven Against Thebes.  In the play, he defended the Proitid gate against Tydeus. He killed two of the seven attacking champions, Mecisteus and Tydeus, but was killed by either Amphiaraus, or by Tydeus himself as he died. (In versions where Melanippus is killed by someone other than Tydeus, the slayer decapitates him and delivers his head to Tydeus). Tydeus  broke Melanippus' skull open and consumed his brain, which disgusted Athena so that she gave up her intent of making Tydeus immortal. Herodotus relates how in historical times, Cleisthenes abolished the hero cult of Adrastus in Sicyon in favour of that of Melanippus.
Melanippus, son of Hicetaon and a native of Percote. He was the brother of Thymoetes, Critolaus and possibly Antenor. Melanippus fought under Hector, wishing to avenge the death of his cousin Dolops, and was killed by Antilochus during the Trojan War.
Melanippus, one of the 50 sons of Priam. His mother was a woman other than Hecuba. He fought in the Trojan War and was killed by Teucer. In some accounts, Melanippus was described to have  a plume of horsehair like his brother Idaeus.
Melanippus, yet another Trojan, who was killed by Patroclus.
Melanippus, one of the Achaeans who fought at Troy. He was one of those who helped Odysseus carry the gifts at the point of reconciliation between Achilles and Agamemnon.
Melanippus, son of Ares and Triteia, daughter of the sea-god Triton, founder of the city of Tritaia, which he named after his own mother.
Melanippus, a young man of Patrae who was in love with Comaetho, but the parents on both sides were against their marriage. Melanippus and Comaetho met secretly in the temple of Artemis, where the girl served as priestess, and had sex there. The outraged goddess cursed the country with plague and famine; in order to put an end to the calamity, the inhabitants of Patrae were instructed by the oracle of Delphi to sacrifice both lovers to the goddess and, from then on, to sacrifice the handsomest young man and the most beautiful girl of the city each year, until a new strange deity is introduced in Patrae. The practice lasted until Eurypylus, son of Euaemon, on his way back from Troy, brought an image of Dionysus to Patrae.
Melanippus, son of Helorus, leader of the Mysian contingent in the Trojan War, killed by Neoptolemus.
Menalippus (misspelling of "Melanippus"? cf. #3 above), a son of Acastus. He, alongside his brother Pleisthenes and their servant Cinyras, was killed by Neoptolemus as they were hunting near the latter's grandfather Peleus' hideout, since Acastus and his family had been hostile towards Peleus.

In ancient Sicily, Melanippus was a hero of Agrigento alongside his lover Chariton. They plotted against the cruel tyrant Phalaris, but were denounced and tortured. However, their mutual love and their refusal to betray their friends as accomplices moved the tyrant, who dismissed them with great praise.

Notes

References 

 Aeschylus, translated in two volumes. 1. Seven Against Thebes by Herbert Weir Smyth, Ph. D. Cambridge, MA. Harvard University Press. 1926. Online version at the Perseus Digital Library. Greek text available from the same website.
 Apollodorus, The Library with an English Translation by Sir James George Frazer, F.B.A., F.R.S. in 2 Volumes, Cambridge, MA, Harvard University Press; London, William Heinemann Ltd. 1921. ISBN 0-674-99135-4. Online version at the Perseus Digital Library. Greek text available from the same website.
 Dictys Cretensis, from The Trojan War. The Chronicles of Dictys of Crete and Dares the Phrygian translated by Richard McIlwaine Frazer, Jr. (1931-). Indiana University Press. 1966. Online version at the Topos Text Project.
 Gaius Julius Hyginus, Fabulae from The Myths of Hyginus translated and edited by Mary Grant. University of Kansas Publications in Humanistic Studies. Online version at the Topos Text Project.
 Herodotus, The Histories with an English translation by A. D. Godley. Cambridge. Harvard University Press. 1920. . Online version at the Topos Text Project. Greek text available at Perseus Digital Library.
 Homer, The Iliad with an English Translation by A.T. Murray, Ph.D. in two volumes. Cambridge, MA., Harvard University Press; London, William Heinemann, Ltd. 1924. . Online version at the Perseus Digital Library.
 Homer, Homeri Opera in five volumes. Oxford, Oxford University Press. 1920. . Greek text available at the Perseus Digital Library.
 Lucius Mestrius Plutarchus, Lives with an English Translation by Bernadotte Perrin. Cambridge, MA. Harvard University Press. London. William Heinemann Ltd. 1914. 1. Online version at the Perseus Digital Library. Greek text available from the same website.
 Ovid, Ibis in Art of Love. Cosmetics. Remedies for Love. Ibis. Walnut-tree. Sea Fishing. Consolation. Translated by J. H. Mozley. Revised by G. P. Goold. Loeb Classical Library No. 232, Cambridge, MA: Harvard University Press, 1929. Online version at Harvard University Press.
 Pausanias, Description of Greece with an English Translation by W.H.S. Jones, Litt.D., and H.A. Ormerod, M.A., in 4 Volumes. Cambridge, MA, Harvard University Press; London, William Heinemann Ltd. 1918. . Online version at the Perseus Digital Library
 Pausanias, Graeciae Descriptio. 3 vols. Leipzig, Teubner. 1903.  Greek text available at the Perseus Digital Library.
 Publius Papinius Statius, The Thebaid translated by John Henry Mozley. Loeb Classical Library Volumes. Cambridge, MA, Harvard University Press; London, William Heinemann Ltd. 1928. Online version at the Topos Text Project.
 Publius Papinius Statius, The Thebaid. Vol I-II. John Henry Mozley. London: William Heinemann; New York: G.P. Putnam's Sons. 1928. Latin text available at the Perseus Digital Library.
 Publius Vergilius Maro, Aeneid. Theodore C. Williams. trans. Boston. Houghton Mifflin Co. 1910. Online version at the Perseus Digital Library.
 Publius Vergilius Maro, Bucolics, Aeneid, and Georgics. J. B. Greenough. Boston. Ginn & Co. 1900. Latin text available at the Perseus Digital Library.
 Strabo, The Geography of Strabo. Edition by H.L. Jones. Cambridge, Mass.: Harvard University Press; London: William Heinemann, Ltd. 1924. Online version at the Perseus Digital Library.
 Strabo, Geographica edited by A. Meineke. Leipzig: Teubner. 1877. Greek text available at the Perseus Digital Library.
 Tzetzes, John, Book of Histories, Book VII-VIII translated by Vasiliki Dogani from the original Greek of T. Kiessling's edition of 1826. Online version at theio.com

Princes in Greek mythology
Children of Ares
Demigods in classical mythology
Children of Theseus
Characters in Seven against Thebes
Trojans
Children of Priam
Aetolian characters in Greek mythology
Theban characters in Greek mythology